The 1950–51 season was Blackpool F.C.'s 43rd season (40th consecutive) in the Football League. They competed in the 22-team Division One, then the top tier of English football, finishing third.

The club also appeared in their second FA Cup Final in four seasons; however, as on the first occasion, they lost, this time to Newcastle United (see 1951 FA Cup Final), who finished one place behind them in the league.

Stan Mortensen was the club's top scorer for the seventh consecutive season, with 35 goals (30 in the league and five in the FA Cup).

Table

Notes

References

Blackpool F.C.
Blackpool F.C. seasons